Ekda Kaay Zala (transl. Once Upon Time) is a 2022 Marathi language Family Drama Directed and Produced By Saleel Kulkarni. The film stars Sumeet Raghvan as the titular character with Urmilla Kothare, Mohan Agashe, Pushkar Shrotri, Mukta Barve, Arjun Purnapatre and Suhas Joshi in pivotal roles.

Plot 
‘Ekda Kaay Zala’ literally means, once upon a time. It is essentially the story of a storyteller. The protagonist of the film- Kiran, is a family man. Father to a 9-year-old boy, Kiran strongly believes in the power of storytelling. He firmly believes that stories have the power to entertain, infuse hope, teach universal life lessons and move you to tears.

Storytelling is omnipotent, and omnipresent and appeals to everyone, irrespective of age. With this conviction that kids learn and absorb much more, through stories being narrated to them through various art forms such as drama, dance etc. rather than the usual conventional methods, he runs a unique school using the idea of storytelling as a pedagogical tool.

His 9-year-old son idolizes him, emulates him in every way and aspires to be like him. The father-son duo shares an inseparable bond.

In a cruel twist of fate, an unexpected event leads to an upheaval in their lives.

Cast 
Sumeet Raghvan as Kiran
Urmila Kothare as Shruti
Arjun Purnapatre as Chintan
Mohan Agashe as Kiran's Father
Suhas Joshi as Kiran's Mother
Pushkar Shrotri as Jay
Mukta Barve as Dr. Saniya
Rajesh Bhosle as Eknath Dada
Merwan Kale as Raghu
Guru as Adwait Wachkawade 
Akash as Adwait Ghulekar

Soundtrack

Reception 

 Anub George of The Times of India has praised the movie by stating it is one of the most valuable films of 2022
 Lokmat published a positive review on the movie
 News 18 talked about Sunidhi Chauhan's Marathi song in the movie
 Maharashtra Times wrote that actors in the movie did justice to their characters
 Pune Mirror wrote the movie is refreshing & very unique
 Hindustan Times wrote "Even though the subject is a difficult one, it has been showcased in a decent manner"

References

External links 

2022 films
Indian drama films
2020s Marathi-language films